Kesar means "saffron flower" in Sanskrit,

Kesar may refer to: The Saffron (Autumn) Crocus. It is a flower which mainly grows in northern India.
It is used in decorating deserts and sweet dishes it is of red colour and gives the dish yellow colour and its taste.

Places

Keshar, Iran (disambiguation), places in Iran

People

Keshar Jung Rayamajhi, Nepalese politician
Keshar Man Rokka, Nepalese politician

See also
Kesari (disambiguation)